The Carpenter is the seventh studio album by folk rock group The Avett Brothers. The album was produced by Rick Rubin who produced their previous full-length studio album, I and Love and You.

The album was listed at #41 on Rolling Stone's list of the top 50 albums of 2012, saying " The palette ranges from Nineties grunge to wintry front-porch lamentation to Beatles bounce, tied together by a sweet Southern-bro sentimentality."

Reception

Upon its release, The Carpenter by The Avett Brothers received generally positive reviews from most music critics. At Metacritic, which assigns a normalized rating out of 100 to reviews from mainstream critics, the album received an average score of 72, based on 24 reviews, which indicates "generally favorable reviews". First and foremost, The Carpenter has received positive or favorable reviews from the following publications: About.com, AllMusic, Alt Rock Live, Alternative Press, American Songwriter, The Austin Chronicle, The A.V. Club, Christianity Today, diffuser.fm, Entertainment Weekly, The Lantern, musicOMH, Paste, PopMatters, Pitchfork,  Punknews.org, Rolling Stone and Taste of Country. On the other hand, The Carpenter got mixed reviews from the following publications: Consequence of Sound, The Guardian, The Independent, The Milk Carton, NME, Pop 'stache and Thank Folk for That.

Track listing

Charts

Weekly charts

Year-end charts

Personnel
The Avett Brothers
 Seth Avett – Lead and backing vocals, acoustic and electric guitars, piano, organ
 Scott Avett – Lead and backing vocals, banjo, acoustic guitar, piano
 Bob Crawford – Upright and electric bass, backing vocals
 Joe Kwon – Cello
 Jacob Edwards - Drums, percussion

Additional Musicians

Lenny Castro - Percussion on all songs excluding "A Father's First Spring"
Benmont Tench - Organ on "The Once & Future Carpenter", "A Father's First Spring", "Life", "Paul Newman vs. The Demons", "Through My Prayers", Mellotron on "A Father's First Spring", Harmonium on "Through My Prayers", Piano on "Winter In My Heart"
Chad Smith - Drums on "Live & Die", "Down With The Shine", "Paul Newman vs. The Demons"
Steven Nistor - Drums on "A Father's First Spring"
Ryan Hewitt - Percussion on "February Seven"
Charlotte & Hattie Webb - Backing vocals on "Life"
Doug Wamble - Slide guitar on "Live & Die"
Blake Mills - Electric guitar on "Live & Die"
Dana Neilsen - Chimes on "I Never Knew You"
April Cap - Oboe on "Through My Prayers"
Geoff Nudell - Bass clarinet on "Through My Prayers"
Ed Roth - Piano on "Through My Prayers"
Danny Moynahan - Saw on "Winter In My Heart"

Production
Rick Rubin - Producer
Ryan Hewitt - Engineering and Mixing
Dave Collins - Mastering
Jake Sinclair - Additional engineering on "Down With the Shine"
Tucker Martine - Additional engineering on "A Father's First Spring"
Jordan Silva, Jon Ashley, Julian Dreyer, Evan Bradford and Evan Hill - Recording assistants
Recorded at Echo Mountain Recording Studios, Asheville, NC, Lock Stock Studio, Venice, CA, Shangri-La, Malibu, CA

Notes and references 

The Avett Brothers albums
2012 albums
Albums recorded at Shangri-La (recording studio)